The former French Roman Catholic Diocese of Saint-Paul-Trois-Châteaux (Latin: Dioecesis Sancti Pauli Tricastinorum; French: Diocèse de Saint-Paul-Trois-Châteaux), sometimes, just like the town, also known as the Diocese of Saint-Paul-en-Tricastin (Latin: Dioecesis Sancti Pauli Tricastinorum; French: Diocèse de Saint-Paul-en-Tricastin), existed from the sixth century to the French Revolution.
 
Its see was at Saint-Paul-Trois-Châteaux, in the modern department of Drôme, southern France. Its territory was included in the expanded Diocese of Valence, by the Napoleonic Concordat of 1801.

History 

Ancient Augusta Tricastinorum became a bishopric in the Roman province of Gallia Viennensis by the IVth century. It first historically recorded bishop seems Florentius, participant at the Council of Epaone (Burgundian Kingdom) in 517.

According to a legend of the fifteenth century, St. Restitutus, first Bishop of St-Paul-Trois-Châteaux, was the man born blind, mentioned in the Gospel. Local traditions also make Saints Eusebuis, Torquatus, Paulus, Amantius, Sulpicius, Bonifatius, Castorinus and Michael early bishops of St-Paul-Trois-Châteaux. Of those, Louis Duchesne regards St. Paulus (fourth or sixth century), patron saint of the city, as the only known bishop, after whom the see was named.

The Diocese of St-Paul-Trois-Châteaux was always dependent on the archdiocese of Arles. Among its bishops were Heraclius (525-42), correspondent of St. Avitus; Saint Martin des Ormeaux (seventh century), who became a solitary.

Owing to Saracen ravages from Iberia (827-29) the see of St-Paul-Trois-Châteaux was, by Decree of Gregory IV, united aeque principaliter (i.e. in personal union) with that of Orange until 1107, when the Diocese of Orange was re-established.

In 1911.06.12, it was united (as title of its Bishops) with the Diocese of Valence. Its Former Cathedral, Ancienne cathédrale Notre-Dame et Saint-Paul, dedicated to Saint-Paul and Our Lady, was not granted co-cathedral status.

Episcopal ordinaries

Suffragan Bishops 
Florent(ius) 517-524
Heraclius 527-541
Victor, before 567-583
Eusebius II. 584-585
Agricole 614
Betton 639-654
...
Bonifatius II. ca. 839
Aldebrand
Pons I. 850-852
...
Udalric (1013-1058)
Géraud I. D'Asteri (1060-1085)
Pons de Port (1095-1112)
Aimar Adhémar (1112?-1119)
Pons de Grillon (1134-1136)
Géraud II. (1138-1147)
Guillaume Hugues, (? - death 1179)
Bertrand de Pierrelatte (1179-1206)
Gaucerand (1206-1211)
Geoffroy de Vogüé (1211-1233)
Laurent (1233-1251)
Bertrand de Clansayes (1251-1286)
Benoit (1288-1292)
Guillaume d'Aubenas (1293-1309)
Dragonet de Montauban (1310-1328)
Hugues Aimery (1328-1348)
Guillaume Guitard (1348-1349)
Jean Coci, Augustinian Order (O.E.S.A.) (1349.11.04 – death 1361), previously Bishop of Vence (France) (1347.08.06 – 1348.08.14), Bishop of Grasse (France) (1348.08.14 – 1349.11.04)
Jacques Artaud (1364-1367), next Bishop of Gap (France) (1366 – 1399)
Raimond Geoffroy de Castellane (1367-1378)
Aimar Fabri de La Roche = Adhémar Fabri de La Roche, Dominican Order (O.P.) (1378.11.10 – 1385.07.12), previously Bishop of Bethléem à Clamecy (France) (1363.11.13 – 1378.11.10); later Bishop of Genève (Switzerland) (1385.07.12 – death 1388.10.08)
Apostolic Administrator Jean de Murol (1385.07.12 – 1388.12.23), while Pseudocardinal-Priest of Ss. Vitale, Valeria, Gervasio e Protasio (1385.07.12 – death 1399.02.10); previously Bishop of Genève (Switzerland) ([1377.09.08] 1378.01.27 – 1385.07.12)
Dieudonné D'Estaing (1388-1411)
Hugues de Theissiac (1411 - death 1448), also Bishop of Vaison (1412 – 1445)
Pons de Sade (1444-1445), next Bishop of Vaison (1445 – 1473)
 ? Romanet Velheu 1445-1449
 Jean de Segóvie 1449-1450 = Juan de Segovia (born Spain) (1449.07.24 – 1450), while Pseudocardinal-Priest of S. Maria in Trastevere (1440.10.02 – death 1458.05.24), next Bishop of Saint-Jean-de-Maurienne (France) (1451.10.13 – retired 1453.01.20), emeritate as Titular Archbishop of Cæsarea (1453.01.20 – death 1458.05.24)
Étienne Genevès (1450-1473)
Ysembert de Laye 1473-1478
Apostolic Administrator Father Astorge Aimery (1478 – 1480.12.11), no other prelature; next Metropolitan Archbishop of Vienne (France) (1480.12.11 – death 1482)
Jean de Sirac 1480-1482
Guillaume Adhémar de Monteil 1482-1516
 ? Jacques de Vesc 1516 (Bishop-elect)
Apostolic Administrator Father Antoine de Lévis de Château-Morand (1516 – 1526), without prelature; later Metropolitan Archbishop of Embrun (France) (1526 – 1561) and Bishop of Saint-Flour (France) (1547 – death 1565)
Michel D'Arandia (1526-1539)
Jean de Joly (1539-1579)
Thomas Pobel (1579-1582)
Jean-Baptiste Legras (1583 – 1583)
Antoine Gaume (1585-1598)
Antoine de Cros 1600-1630
François Adhémar de Monteil de Grignan (1630.12.16 – 1645.01.16), next Metropolitan Archbishop of Arles (France) ([1644.03.31] 1645.01.16 – death 1689.03.09)
Jacques Adhémar de Monteil  de Grignan (1645.03.20 – 1657), next Coadjutor Bishop of Uzès (France) ([1657.05.22] 1658.09.30 – 1660.02.12), succeeding as Bishop of Uzès (France) (1660.02.12 – death 1674.09.13)
Claude Ruffier (1657-1674)
Luc D'Acquin (1674-1680)
Louis-Aube de Roquemartine (1682.05.25 – death 1713.09.19), previously Bishop of Grasse (France) ([1675.09.16] 1676.11.16 – 1682.05.25)
Joseph-Maurel du Chaffaut (1714-1717)
Claude de Simiane de Gordes (1717-1743)
Pierre-François-Xavier de Reboul de Lambert (1743-1791)
Apostolic Administrator Blessed Jean Marie du Lau (1791 – 1791), while Metropolitan Archbishop of Arles (France) ([1775.02.26] 1775.04.24 – death 1792.09.02)
 Pierre Genès Tavernier (1800-1802).

See also 
 List of Catholic dioceses in France
 Catholic Church in France

References

Sources and external links 
 GCatholic with Google satellite photo - former bishopric
 GCatholic, with Google satellite photo/map - former cathedral
 https://web.archive.org/web/20110606073610/http://www.catholic.org/printer_friendly.php?id=11875&section=Encyclopedia [information at Catholic.org]
 pp. 548–549. (Use with caution; obsolete)
  p. 301. (in Latin)
 p. 175.

 p. 219.
 

Bibliography 
 Louis-Anselme Boyer de Sainte-Marthe, Histoire de l'Eglise cathédrale de Saint-Paul-Trois-Châteaux avec une chronologie de tous les Evêques qui l'ont gouvernée, Avignon 1710
 Louis Duchesne, Fastes épiscopaux de l'ancienne Gaule, vol. I, Paris 1907, pp. 263–265
 Denis de Sainte-Marthe, Gallia christiana, vol. I, Paris 1715, coll. 703-740
 Papal Bulla Qui Christi Domini, in Bullarii romani continuatio, Vol. XI, Rome 1845, pp. 245–249
 Pius Bonifacius Gams, Series episcoporum Ecclesiae Catholicae, Leipzig 1931, pp. 619–620
 Konrad Eubel, Hierarchia Catholica Medii Aevi'', vol. 1, p. 497; vol. 2, pp. 255–256; vol. 3, p. 318; vol. 4, p. 344; vol. 5, p. 389; vol. 6, p. 415
 The Making of the French Episcopate, 1589-1661 By Joseph Bergin

Former Roman Catholic dioceses in France
Dioceses established in the 6th century
6th-century establishments in France
1801 disestablishments in France